The Croatian Academy of Sciences and Arts (founded in 1866 as Yugoslav Academy of Sciences and Arts) is the national academy of Croatia. The Academy's membership consists of full, corresponding, honorary and associate members. Full members of the academy are elected from among scientists and artists who are Croatian citizens, and who have made outstanding achievements in their particular fields. , the Academy's statute limits the number of full members to 160.

The following is a list of full members of the Academy, current and past.



Past members

Current members

See also

References

Sources

Croatian Academy Of Sciences And Arts
Members Of The Croatian Academy Of Sciences And Arts